Farhad Majidi (born 3 June 1976) is an Iranian football coach and former player who currently manages Al-Ittihad Kalba SC in UAE Pro League.

He mostly played as attacking midfielder for Esteghlal when he was a football player. He scored 2 important goal for AlAin at 2002–03 AFC Champions League Semi-Final and Final match; started his career at Bahman club and also played in Austrian, Emirati and Qatari clubs. He was a member of Iran national football team from 1996 to 2011 and played 45 games for the national team. In 2010, he was nominated for the Asian Footballer of the Year award which finished second in voting. Majidi is especially popular among fans for scoring the winning goals in Tehran Derby match. His fans have given him the title of "King Farhad".

Club career
Having played for Esteghlal Tehran for several seasons, Majidi's performance attracted Rapid Vienna to recruit him for one season. However, the offer for a permanent transfer to Austria was not accepted by the Austrians, and they released Majidi who joined Al-Wasl in the UAE.

In the UAE League and in combination with his compatriot Alireza Vahedi Nikbakht, Majidi scored a handful of goals and topped the league chart with Al Wasl. Majidi was unlucky with injuries and was out of action for quite a few matches. One of the highlights of Majidi's career was his short loan to Al-Ain. Majidi was the star of the 2002–03 AFC Champions League semi-final game against Dalian Shide. His goal helped Al Ain to reach the AFC Champions League final match, eventually winning the trophy for the first time in the club's history.

All together in the five years Majidi played for Al Wasl FC, he scored over 100 goals. He left Al Wasl in 2006, joining another UAE club, Al-Nasr.

On 10 February 2007, Majidi signed a contract until the end of the season with Al-Ahli. At the end of the season, Majidi signed a season-long contract with Esteghlal tehran. He extended his contract with Esteghlal tehran for two more season and he was mostly used as the attacking midfielder in 2008–09 season which ended up in winning the league. He had a very good season in 2009–10 season where he was the top scorer of the team and one of the top scorers of ACL.

On 21 December 2011, Majidi left Esteghlal due to personal problems and joined the Qatari side Al Gharrafa. He played until the end of the season at Al Gharafa and his contract was expired on 1 July 2012. Majidi announced his retirement from football on 28 September 2012 after Esteghlal refused to offer him a contract extension. but upon request of Esteghlal fans and management, he later withdrew his decision and rejoined the team with an 18-months contract on 18 December 2012. He then won the league title with the team and scored six goals. Finally, Majidi retired for the second time as a football player on 29 October 2013 after Esteghlal was unable to qualified to the finals of the 2013 AFC Champions League.

International career
He made his debut for Iran national football team in December 1996 in the 1996 Asian Cup match against Saudi Arabia. He was occasionally getting called up but never became a regular starter till the arrival of Branko Ivankovic where he was experiencing the top of his football. He was mostly benched by Ivankovic because of Ali Daei and Arash Borhani and decided to leave Team Melli camp in 2004 just before the 2004 AFC Asian Cup where Iran lost the 2006 FIFA World Cup qualification match against Jordan in Tehran and he was benched for the whole match. Before the 2006 FIFA World Cup, he was called for a few friendlies but could not break it through to the tournament. Majidi was invited by Amir Ghalenoei and Afshin Ghotbi in 2006 and 2009 for the 2007 AFC Asian Cup qualification and 2011 AFC Asian Cup qualification for a couple of matches and was used as the substitute. He was called for few friendlies three months before 2011 AFC Asian Cup but decided to announce his retirement. Majidi was again invited on 23 August 2011 by Carlos Queiroz. He was the oldest player in the Iran national team since he had been a member of the team since 1996, however Majidi does not have many international caps. Farhad Majidi and the Persepolis captain, Ali Karimi, were considered two of the fans' favorite players during the 2014 FIFA World Cup qualification. On 27 September 2011, Majidi announced his retirement from national playing.

Career statistics

Club career statistics

Assists

International goals
Scores and results list Iran's goal tally first.

Managerial statistics

The result of wins and losses on penalties is calculated in the statistics of wins and losses.

Honours

Player

Club

Esteghlal
Persian Gulf Pro League: 1997–98, 2008–09, 2012–13
Hazfi Cup: 2007–08
AFC Champions League runner-up: 1998–99

Al-Ain
AFC Champions League: 2002–03

Al-Ahli
UAE Football League: 2005–06

Al-Gharafa
Emir of Qatar Cup: 2012

National
Iran
WAFF Championship: 2004

Manager
Esteghlal
Persian Gulf Pro League: 2021–22
Hazfi Cup runner-up: 2019–20, 2020–21

References 

 
 
 
 
 
 
 Persianleague Profile
 Soccermanager Profile
Farhad Majidi on Instagram

1976 births
Living people
People from Qaem Shahr
People from Tehran
Iranian footballers
Association football forwards
Iranian football managers
Esteghlal F.C. players
SK Rapid Wien players
Al-Nasr SC (Dubai) players
Al Ahli Club (Dubai) players
Al-Wasl F.C. players
Al Ain FC players
Al-Gharafa SC players
Bahman players
Esteghlal F.C. managers
Iranian expatriate footballers
Iran international footballers
Expatriate footballers in Austria
Azadegan League players
Persian Gulf Pro League players
Austrian Football Bundesliga players
UAE Pro League players
Qatar Stars League players
Sportspeople from Mazandaran province
Al-Ittihad Kalba SC managers
Persian Gulf Pro League managers